The ERT Bridge over Blacks Fork near Fort Bridger, Wyoming, was listed on the National Register of Historic Places in 1985 as part of a thematic study on early 20th century steel truss bridges in Wyoming. Set on concrete abutments, the ERT Bridge was built around 1920 by Uinta County. It is an example of a transitional design from locally built bridges to standardized State designs

See also
List of bridges documented by the Historic American Engineering Record in Wyoming

References

External links

Road bridges on the National Register of Historic Places in Wyoming
Bridges completed in 1920
Buildings and structures in Uinta County, Wyoming
Transportation in Uinta County, Wyoming
Historic American Engineering Record in Wyoming
National Register of Historic Places in Uinta County, Wyoming
Steel bridges in the United States
Warren truss bridges in the United States